Dan Thomas (born 11 October 1993) is a Welsh rugby union player currently playing for the Bristol Bears, having previously played for both Llanelli RFC and Gloucester. His position is Flanker. He is a Wales Under-20 international.

In January 2013 he was selected in the Wales Under 20 squad for the 2013 Six Nations Under 20s Championship.

On 2 May 2017, Thomas left Gloucester to join local rivals Bristol in the RFU Championship ahead of the 2017–18 season. Bristol Head coach (at the time) Mark Tainton said that Thomas' form and physicality 'impressed', whilst at previous club, Gloucester.

On 1 March 2019 Thomas scored his first English Premiership try for Bristol, in a dramatic and close victory, against former team Gloucester.

Thomas rejoined the Scarlets on a short term loan on 20 October 2022, as injury cover.

References

External links
 Bristol Profile

1993 births
Living people
Bristol Bears players
Gloucester Rugby players
Rugby union players from Carmarthen
Rugby union flankers
Scarlets players
Welsh rugby union players